Iron Chef UK is a British competition-based cooking show based on Fuji Television's Iron Chef and Food Network's Iron Chef America. It was produced by IWC Media and broadcast on Channel 4 in 2010.

Summary

The show aired during daytime, five days a week at 5pm in 2010, and was hosted by Olly Smith and Nick Nairn. The four Iron Chefs were Tom Aikens, Martin Blunos, Sanjay Dwivedi and Judy Joo. Like the original Iron Chef, the competitions were held in Kitchen Stadium and presided over by the Chairman. Judging occurred in two rounds, with the first round being appetisers, and the second being the main courses. Two challengers prepared an appetiser each, while professional chefs, the Iron Chefs prepared two dishes. They were judged, and the scores for the challenging team versus the Iron Chef were announced. Then the second half of the team and the Iron Chef returned to the kitchen to prepare the main course. The two challengers each prepared a dish and the Iron Chef prepared two. Judging resumed, and results announced. As well as announcing whether the Challenging team, or the Iron Chef won, the best dish from the challenging team was also announced.  The challengers with the best dish returned on the following Friday to compete with the best Iron Chef of the week.  Dishes were scored out of 25—15 for taste, 5 for design, and 5 for originality in the use of the special ingredient.

The first episode aired on 26 April 2010. Liz Moore from Northern Ireland was the first finalist.

Internationally

The show has been seen worldwide by countries including India, Finland, New Zealand, Belgium, Netherlands, and Luxembourg.

The Iron Chefs

Notes

External links
Iron Chef UK at Channel4.com

UK
British cooking television shows
2010s British cooking television series
2010s British reality television series
2010 British television series debuts
2010 British television series endings
Channel 4 original programming
Cooking competitions in the United Kingdom
British television series based on Japanese television series
Television series by Banijay